Fracara is a genus of moths of the family Noctuidae.

References
Natural History Museum Faracra facts

Hadeninae
Noctuidae